Thomas Munce House is a historic house in South Strabane Township, Washington County, Pennsylvania. The earliest section was built in c. 1794 with additions in c. 1810 and 1835.  The house is -story, stone, vernacular, Georgian-influenced with a gabled roof and a façade with five openings.  The house is representative of the more substantial second-generation houses built to replace earlier log houses in Washington County.

It is designated as a historic residential landmark/farmstead by the Washington County History & Landmarks Foundation, and is listed on the National Register of Historic Places.

References

Houses on the National Register of Historic Places in Pennsylvania
Georgian architecture in Pennsylvania
Houses completed in 1803
Houses in Washington County, Pennsylvania
National Register of Historic Places in Washington County, Pennsylvania